Aphareus (Ancient Greek: Ἀφαρεύς) may refer to the following figures.
Aphareus, a Messenian king, son of Perieres and Gorgophone.
 Aphareus, a Centaur that attended the wedding of Pirithous and Hippodamia. In the battle initiated by the Centaurs, he tried to throw a rock at his opponents but was killed by Theseus.
Aphareus, a Greek warrior in the Trojan War who was one of the seven captains of the sentinels along with, Thrasymedes, Ascalaphus, Ialmenus, Meriones, Deipyrus and Lycomedes. He was the son of Caletor. Aeneas leapt upon Aphareus and struck him on the throat with a sharp spear, slaying the Achaean warrior eventually.
 Aphareus, an Athenian rhetor, son of the sophist Hippias and Plathane.

Notes

References 

 Apollodorus, The Library with an English Translation by Sir James George Frazer, F.B.A., F.R.S. in 2 Volumes, Cambridge, MA, Harvard University Press; London, William Heinemann Ltd. 1921. ISBN 0-674-99135-4. Online version at the Perseus Digital Library. Greek text available from the same website.
Homer, The Iliad with an English Translation by A.T. Murray, Ph.D. in two volumes. Cambridge, MA., Harvard University Press; London, William Heinemann, Ltd. 1924. Online version at the Perseus Digital Library.
 Homer, Homeri Opera in five volumes. Oxford, Oxford University Press. 1920. Greek text available at the Perseus Digital Library.
 Publius Ovidius Naso, Metamorphoses translated by Brookes More (1859-1942). Boston, Cornhill Publishing Co. 1922. Online version at the Perseus Digital Library.
 Publius Ovidius Naso, Metamorphoses. Hugo Magnus. Gotha (Germany). Friedr. Andr. Perthes. 1892. Latin text available at the Perseus Digital Library.

Achaeans (Homer)